Joanne Louise Whitfield  (born 21 December 1968) is the Chief Executive of Co-op Food.

Early life
She was born in St Helens, then in Lancashire.

She took A-levels (including English Literature and Politics) at Widnes & Runcorn Sixth Form College (now Riverside College, Halton).
She attended Aston University from 1987 to 1991, studying Management.

Career

Northern Foods
She worked for Northern Foods from 1995 to 2000.

Matalan
She worked for Matalan from 2002 to 2008.

Asda
She joined Asda in July 2008.

Co-op
She joined the Co-op in April 2016 as Finance Director for Co-op Food and Retail. She became Chief Executive of Co-op Food in March 2017, making her the first female CEO of a British food retailer. In 2019, she received the Veuve Clicquot businesswoman of the year award for her work on improving the stores' sales and sustainable practices.

Whitfield was appointed Commander of the Order of the British Empire (CBE) in the 2021 New Year Honours for services to retail and the food supply chain during the COVID-19 response.

Personal life
She lives in Trafford borough, in Altrincham. She married in April 2003 in Manchester.

References

External links
 Jo Whitfield profile at Co-Op
 Jo Whitfield profile at Bloomberg.com

1968 births
Alumni of Aston University
British retail chief executives
British women chief executives
English businesspeople in retailing
People from Altrincham
People from Prescot
The Co-operative Group
Living people
Commanders of the Order of the British Empire